Hanan Townshend is a New Zealand-born film composer best known for his work in Terrence Malick films such as The Tree of Life, Knight of Cups, and To the Wonder.

Career
Townshend was a music licensee on Terrence Malick's Palme d'Or winning film The Tree of Life, where he received his first significant recognition. He has composed for numerous feature films, including Malick’s 2012 film To the Wonder and more recently, Knight of Cups, starring Christian Bale, Natalie Portman, Cate Blanchett and Imogen Poots. He has scored over a dozen large commercials for brands such as Apple, American Express, Nike and Google. He has also collaborated with producers such as Mike McCarthy and Daniel Lanois.

Themes and style
Townshend’s music reflects the broad background of inspiration from which he draws – the poetic soundscapes of his home country, the eager patterns of popular music, and the refinement of classical training and studies in art composition. Because of this, he has a penchant for approaching film music from a less conventional perspective and producing clever, memorable pieces that support just as much the picturesque as they do the auditory experience.

Filmography

References

Year of birth missing (living people)
Living people
New Zealand artists
New Zealand film score composers